The Magic Garden is a 1927 American silent drama film directed by James Leo Meehan and starring Joyce Coad, Margaret Morris and Philippe De Lacy. The film's sets were designed by the art director Carroll Clark. It is an adaptation of the novel of the same by Gene Stratton-Porter.

Cast
 Joyce Coad as Amaryllis Minton, as a child 
 Margaret Morris as Amaryllis Minton, as an adult 
 Philippe De Lacy as John Guido Forrester, as a child 
 Raymond Keane as John Guido, as an adult 
 Charles Clary as Paul Minton
 William V. Mong as John Forrester 
 Cesare Gravina as Maestro 
 Paulette Duval as Countess di Varesi 
 Walter Wilkinson as Peter Minton, as a child 
 Earl McCarthy as Peter Minton, as an adult 
 Alfred Allen as Chief Clare 
 Kathrin Clare Ward as Mrs. O'Rourke
 Ruth Cherrington as Duenna

References

Bibliography
 Munden, Kenneth White. The American Film Institute Catalog of Motion Pictures Produced in the United States, Part 1. University of California Press, 1997.

External links

1927 films
1927 drama films
Silent American drama films
Films directed by James Leo Meehan
American silent feature films
1920s English-language films
American black-and-white films
Film Booking Offices of America films
Films based on works by Gene Stratton-Porter
Films based on American novels
1920s American films